Butamben is a local anesthetic.  Proprietary names includes Alvogil in Spain and Alvogyl in Switzerland. It is one of three components in the topical anesthetic Cetacaine.

Chemistry 

It is the ester of 4-aminobenzoic acid and butanol. A white, odourless, crystalline powder. that is mildly soluble in water (1 part in 7000) and soluble in alcohol, ether, chloroform, fixed oils, and dilute acids. It slowly hydrolyses when boiled with water. Synonyms include Butamben, Butilaminobenzoato, and Butoforme.

Synthesis

The esterification between 4-Nitrobenzoic acid [62-23-7] (1) and 1-Butanol [71-36-3] (2) gives Butyl 4-Nitrobenzoate [120-48-9] (3). Bechamp reduction then gives Butamben (4).

Alternatively, 4-aminobenzoic acid can be used directly.

References